The Portraitist is a 2005 Polish television documentary film about the life and work of Wilhelm Brasse, the famous "photographer of Auschwitz", made for TVP1, Poland, which first aired in its "Proud to Present" series on January 1, 2006.  It also premiered at the Polish Film Festival, at the West London Synagogue, in London, on March 19, 2007.

Background

In August 1940, when he was 23, after fleeing the Nazi occupation of Żywiec, his home town in southern Poland, Wilhelm Brasse was captured at the Polish-Hungarian border and deported to KL Auschwitz-Birkenau, as prisoner number 3444. Trained before the beginning of World War II as a portrait photographer at his aunt's studio, he was ordered by his SS supervisors to photograph "what they told him to photograph: prisoners' work, criminal medical experiments, portraits of the prisoners for the files." Brasse has estimated that he took about 40,000 to 50,000 "identity pictures" from 1940 until 1945, before being forcibly moved to another concentration camp in Austria, where he was liberated by the American forces in May 1945.

While not all of Brasse's photographs are  extant, 40,000 that did survive are kept in archives, with some on display, at the Auschwitz-Birkenau State Museum, and at Yad Vashem, the Holocaust Martyrs' and Heroes' Remembrance Authority, Israel's official memorial to the Jewish victims of the Holocaust, and some of the Auschwitz-Birkinau State Museum archival photographs and related iconography are presented visually in the film, with narration through interviews with Brasse.

Synopsis

Portrecista (The Portraitist) examines the life and work of Wilhelm Brasse, who had been trained as a portrait photographer at his aunt's studio prior to World War II and passionately loved taking photographs. After his capture and imprisonment by the Nazis at Auschwitz concentration camp in 1940, at the age of 23, he was forced to take "identity pictures" of between approximately 40,000 to 50,000 other inmates between 1940 and 1945.  With "courage and skill", documenting "cruelty which goes beyond all words ... for future generations", after his liberation at the end of World War II, Brasse "could not continue with his profession" and would never take another photograph.

In Portrecista Brasse relates the "story behind some pictures in the Auschwitz-Birkenau State Museum archives that he remembers taking," which is "illustrated with archive stock and iconography."

Production details and screenings

Written, directed, and edited by Irek Dobrowolski, produced by Anna Dobrowolska for TVP1, Poland, and filmed by cinematographer Jacek Taszakowski, this documentary film, starring Wilhelm Brasse (as himself), was first shown in the "Proud to Present" series on the Polish television station TVP1 on January 24, 2006, and then was shown at the Warsaw International Film Festival's "Jewish Motives" division, where it won the Grand Prix "Golden Phoenix of Warsaw" and at the 46th Kraków Film Festival, where it won the National Competition Silver "Lajkonik".  Its English premiere as The Portraitist was at the Polish Film Festival, at West London Synagogue, in London, on March 19, 2007, with a second screening by popular demand, on April 22, 2007, and, after the premiere, the audience participated in a "Q&A" with Dobrowolski and Brasse.

It was also screened at other Polish film festivals throughout Europe and film festivals in North America and garnered some additional awards.

Selected critical responses

In her 2004 book Photographing the Holocaust: Interpreting the Evidence, published a year before the release of this film, Auschwitz historian Janina Struk recounted "the history of the use and abuse of Holocaust photographs" depicting atrocities. Struk interviewed Brasse for her book in 2000. At the camp's photo processing room, he saw the footage of Soviet POWs being massacred with axes outside Block 11, and said, that he will never forget the scenes in this film made by SS man Walter using his 16mm Agfa Monik film camera. The Germans keen on documenting the industrial nature of murder did not possess the knowledge and skills of photo lab technicians, and relegated the work to Erkennungsdienst prisoners like Brasse, "the portraitist" of Auschwitz.

The film program of the Toronto Photography Festival 'Contact 2008' held throughout the month of May, in Toronto, Ontario, Canada, where The Portraitist was shown on May 10, says that "Brasse tells his story with chilling simplicity and haunting detail", noting that some images may disturb.

In reviewing the Contact 2008 screening, Fran Schechter observes that "Director Ireneusz Dobrowolski mixes the recollections of the now elderly survivor [Wilhelm Brasse] with a gallery of mug shots and SS portraits and wartime film footage of ghettos and concentration camps."  Schechter notes: "Any Holocaust testimony has an impact", but adds: "this film could have delved deeper into the question of why the Nazis made photographs and other documentation of people they considered expendable", and is left wondering: "Were they proud of their savage efficiency, or using photography to normalize their actions?"  Such questions lead to another controversial subject: "the roots of Nazi psychology", the title of a 2000 book by Jay Y. Gonen.

See also

 Czesława Kwoka
 Expulsion of Poles by Germany
 Kidnapping of Polish children by Nazi Germany
 Nazi crimes against ethnic Poles
 Photography of the Holocaust

Notes

References
 "Children during the Holocaust".  United States Holocaust Memorial Museum Encyclopedia (Holocaust Encyclopedia).  Accessed August 28, 2008.  (Feature article.)
 Gonen, Jay Y. The Roots of Nazi Psychology: Hitler's Utopian Barbarism. Lexington: U of Kentucky Press, 2000. .  (Rev. by Lebovic, as listed below.)
 Harley, Kevin.  "Polish Film Festival".  The Independent, March 10, 2007.  FindArticles.com.  Accessed September 1, 2008.
 Kubica, Helena.  The Extermination at KL Auschwitz of Poles Evicted from the Zamość Region in the Years 1942–1943.  "New Book from Auschwitz-Birkenau Museum: Memorial Book ... The Expulsion of Polish Civilians from the Zamosc Region".  Auschwitz-Birkenau State Museum, Poland. July 17, 2004.  Accessed August 29, 2008.  (Press release.)
 –––.  Nie wolno o nich zapomnieć/Man darf się nie vergessen Najmłodsze ofiary Auschwitz/Die jüngsten Opfer von Auschwitz.  Auschwitz-Birkenau State Museum Publications.  Państwowe Muzeum Auschwitz-Birkenau w Oświęcimiu, 2002.  . (Polish–German version)  ["This new album is devoted to the memory of the children deported to Auschwitz Concentration Camp, the majority of whom were murdered in the camp by the Germans or fell victim to the conditions of life in the camp."] Featured in Auschwitz–Birkenau: Memorial and Museum: A Brief History and Basic Facts. (Web PDF).  Auschwitz-Birkenau State Museum, Poland.  27 pages. (In English.)  [Also listed as: "Published by Państwowe Muzeum Auschwitz-Birkenau w Oświęcimiu, 2003.  383 pages; text, illustrations, indexes (including "Register of Names": 373–81).  24,5x31cm; Polish-German version."]
 Lebovic, Nitzan. Review of The Roots of Nazi Psychology: Hitler's Utopian Barbarism, by Jay Y. Gonen.  H-German, H-Net Reviews (Humanities and Social Sciences Online), June 2004.
 Lukas, Richard C. Did the Children Cry? Hitler's War against Jewish and Polish Children, 1939–1945.  New York: Hippocrene Books, 2001. Project InPosterum: Preserving the Past for the Future, projectinposterum.org.  Accessed August 28, 2008.  (Excerpts from text.)
 –––.  Forgotten Holocaust: The Poles under German Occupation, 1939–1944.  1986.  Rev. ed. New York: Hippocrene Books, .  (Rev. by Rooney.)
 Painting Czesława Kwoka, by Theresa Edwards (verse) and Lori Schreiner (art) after a series of photographs by Wilhelm Brasse.  AdmitTwo (a2), 19 (September 2007).  admit2.net.  Accessed August 28, 2008.
 The Portraitist (Portrecista, Poland, 2005) – 5th Polish Film Festival Programme. Spiro Ark and the Polish Cultural Institute  (UK).  West London Synagogue, London.  March 19 and April 22, 2007.  (In Polish; with English subtitles.)
 Rees, Laurence.   Auschwitz: A New History.  PublicAffairs, 2006. .  Google Books.  Accessed August 29, 2008.  (Provides hyperlinked "Preview".) [Companion book for Auschwitz: Inside the Nazi State.]
 "Reflecting History: The Portraitist (Portrecista)".  2007 Chicago International Documentary Festival, Chicago, Illinois.  The Wilmette Theatre, March 30, 2007; Chopin Theatre, April 4, 2007.  chicagodocfestival.org 2007.  Accessed September 1, 2008.
 Rooney, David "The Forgotten Holocaust: The Poles under German Occupation, 1939–1944".  National Review, September 26, 1986.  FindArticles.com. Accessed August 29, 2008.  (Rev. of Lukas, Forgotten Holocaust.)
 Schechter, Fran.  "Film Festival Reviews: The Portraitist".  Now Toronto (Now Communications Inc), May 10, 2008.
 Struk, Janina. " I will never forget these scenes' ".  Guardian.co.uk (Guardian Media Group), January 20, 2005.  Accessed August 28, 2008.  (Interview with Wilhelm Brasse.)
 –––.  Photographing the Holocaust: Interpretations of the Evidence.  New York and London: I.B. Tauris, 2004.  . Google Books.  Accessed August 29, 2008.  (Provides hyperlinked "Preview".)
 Words & Images: A Collaboration.  Curators: Stuart Copans and Arlene Distler.  Windham Art Gallery, Brattleboro, Vermont, June 1 – July 1, 2007.  (Exhibition.)
 Zychowicz, Piotr.  "The Brothels at Auschwitz: A Little-Known Aspect of the History of the Nazi German Camp".  Auschwitz-Birkenau Memorial and Museum.  Auschwitz-Birkenau State Museum, Poland.  Rpt. from Rzeczpospolita, July 21, 2007.  Accessed August 29, 2008.  [Includes interview with "Wilhelm Brasse (number 3444), the famous photographer of Auschwitz."]

External links
 
 Rekontrplan Film Group official website
 
 
 Archives.  United States Holocaust Memorial Museum (USHMM).  (Description of all its archives, including: "A combined catalog of published materials available in the Museum's Library, and unpublished archival materials available in the Museum's Archives. The published materials include books, serials, videos, CDs and other media. The unpublished archival materials include microfilm and microfiche, paper collections, photographs, music, and video and audio tapes." Among "unpublished" photographs in the USHMM searchable online Photo Archives are some of Wilhelm Brasse's "identification photographs", featured online with identification of Brasse as the photographer, credit to the "National Auschwitz-Birkenau Museum", identification of individual donors, and/or USHMM copyright notices.  Visitors to the site who download any of these archived photographs are directed to contact the USHMM in writing for terms and conditions of use.)
 Auschwitz-Birkenau Memorial and Museum.  Auschwitz-Birkenau State Museum, Poland. English version.  (Includes Centre for Education About Auschwitz and the Holocaust.) Further reference: "Technical page", with credits and copyright notice, pertaining to the official Website and official publications of the Auschwitz-Birkenau State Museum.
 "Auschwitz-Birkenau State Museum Publications: Albums, Catalogues".  (English version; also available in Polish and German.)
 International Tracing Service – "The International Tracing Service (ITS) in Bad Arolsen serves victims of Nazi persecutions and their families by documenting their fate through the archives it manages. The ITS preserves these historic records and makes them available for research."  (Opened to the public in November 2007.)
 Photographs of Wilhelm Brasse on the occasion of "Ein Gespräch mit Erich Hackl, Wilhelm Brasse und Ireneusz Dobrowolski" ("An interview with Erich Hackl, Wilhelm Brasse and Ireneusz Dobrowolski"), moderated by Jacek St. Buras, about The Portraitist, October 20, 2006, featured in Deutschsprachige Gegenwartsliteratur in Polen at kroki.pl (Reihe Schritte/Kroki).  (Text and captions in German.)
 "Portraitist" ("Portrecista") – Official Webpage of Rekontrplan Film Group (Distributor).  Adobe Flash content, including video clip. (Access: >Productions>Documentaries>Portraitist).  Television documentary film produced for TVP1, "a television channel owned by TVP (Telewizja Polska S.A.)"  [Updated "Events/News" re: screenings at Polish film festivals and awards also on site.]  (English and Polish language options.)  (Original language of film: Polish.  With English subtitles.)
 "Resources & Collections: About the Photo Archive" at Yad Vashem.
 Clip from the Portraitist footage and interview with Wilhelm Brasse

Documentary television films
Documentary films about the Holocaust
Polish short documentary films
Documentary films about photographers
2005 short documentary films
Auschwitz concentration camp
Documentary films about Poland